A list of manufacturing companies founded in South Australia, many now forgotten but "household names" in their day. It does not include local affiliates of multinational companies, such as General Motors Holden, Kelvinator and Philips Electrical Industries. Nor does it (yet) include food and beverage companies such as AMSCOL, Chapmans, Coopers, Glen Ewin and Haighs or pharmaceuticals and toiletries such as Bickfords, Cromptons and Fauldings.

References

South Australia-related lists
Economy of South Australia
Economy of Australia-related lists
Manufacturing companies of Australia
Lists of companies of Australia